Franke is both a German-language surname and a given name.

Surname 
 Bernd Franke (born 1948), German soccer player
 Bette Franke (born 1989), Dutch fashion model
 Bob Franke (born 1947), American folk singer and song writer
 Christian Wilhelm Franke, one of the editors of early editions of the Brockhaus Enzyklopädie
 Christopher Franke (born 1953), German musician/composer in Tangerine Dream
 Donald T. Franke (1921–2013), American jurist and legislator
 Edgar Franke (born 1960), German politician
 Egon Franke (fencer) (born 1935), Polish Olympic fencer
 Egon Franke (politician) (1913–1995), German politician (SPD)
 Elsa Thiemann (née Franke, 1910–1981), German photographer
 Garance Franke-Ruta (born 1972), American writer and editor
 Guillaume Franke (born 1987), German rugby union player
 Herbert Franke (sinologist) (1914–2011), German sinologist, co-author of the Cambridge History of China
 Herbert W. Franke (1927–2022), Austrian science fiction writer
 Jay Anthony Franke (born 1972), American actor, voice actor and musician
 Jens Franke (born 1964), German mathematician
 Josef Franke (1876–1944), German architect
 Keith Franke (1954–1988), American professional wrestler known as Adrian Adonis
 Marcel Franke (born 5 April 1993), German footballer
 Matthieu Franke (born 1985), German rugby union player
 Nikki Franke (born 1951), American fencer and fencing coach
 Stéphane Franke (1964–2011), German long distance runner
 Victor Franke (1865–1936), German military officer
 Werner Franke (1940–2022), German professor and biologist
 William B. Franke (1894–1979), American financial manager, U.S. Secretary of the Navy 1959–1961
 Yannick Franke (born 1996), Dutch basketball player

Given name 
 Franke Previte, American composer
 Franke Rupert (1888–1971),  Austrian engraver

See also
 Franke (company), Swiss manufacturing company
 Franke and the Knockouts, American band in the early 1980s
 Franke Institute for the Humanities at the University of Chicago
 Francke, surname
 Franken (disambiguation)

German-language surnames
Ethnonymic surnames